is a Japanese singer, model, actress, and reporter. She is a member of Japanese idol group Hinatazaka46, represented by Sony Music Records, and also an exclusive model for the fashion magazine Non-no.

Sasaki has appeared in dramas such as Women's Gourmet Burger Club (2020) and Kakegurui Twin (2021), and starred in Koeharu! (2021). She is also a lifestyle reporter for the Nippon TV morning show ZIP!

Career

Music 
In 2013, Sasaki became a founding member of the Osaka-based local idol group . She left the group on November 1, 2015.

On 11 May 2016, Sasaki passed the auditions for new members of Keyakizaka46's subgroup Hiragana Keyakizaka46, which was hosted on the streaming platform Showroom. Sasaki, along with ten other people that passed the audition, joined Neru Nagahama in Hiragana Keyakizaka46 and was known as the "first generation". Her first concert occurred on 28 October of the same year at Akasaka Blitz, where she performed Kanji Keyakizaka46's songs "Silent Majority" and "Sekai ni wa Ai Shika Nai", as well as Hiragana Keyakizaka46's own "Hiragana Keyaki".

During her time at Hiragana Keyakizaka46, she has consistently appeared in every single between "Sekai ni wa Ai Shika Nai" and "Kuroi Hitsuji". She also appeared in every Hinatazaka46 single to date and a Sakamichi AKB song, "Hatsukoi Door", which included select members from the Sakamichi Series.

Other ventures 
Sasaki portrayed the main character in the music video of Aimer's 2019 song "Hanabiratachi no March". In February 2019, she became an exclusive model for the fashion magazine Non-no. On 18 September 2019, Sasaki hosted the 2019 MTV Video Music Awards Japan along with fellow Hinatazaka46 members Kumi Sasaki, Nao Kosaka, and Miho Watanabe.

As a bread lover, Sasaki hosted her first self-titled special program  (2019) on TV Asahi CS 1. In April 2020, she became a regular lifestyle reporter for the  segment of the long-running Nippon TV morning show, . She also appeared in the TV Tokyo drama  (2020) and as Mikura Sado in the live-action series adaptation of Kakegurui Twin (2021), and starred in the Hinatazaka46 drama Koeharu! (2021).

Personal life 
Sasaki was born in Kanagawa Prefecture and raised in Hyōgo Prefecture. She lived in Taiwan for four years as a child and can speak Mandarin.

Filmography

Theater

Television

Variety and talk shows

Dramas

Music video

Radio

Discography

Keyakizaka46 singles

Keyakizaka46 albums 
The songs listed below are not included in any singles above.

Hinatazaka46 singles

Sakamichi AKB

Videography

Video albums

References

External links 
  
  (August 2, 2016 - ) 
  on Showroom 
  (May 8, 2022 - ) 

Japanese idols
Hinatazaka46 members
Japanese female models
Musicians from Hyōgo Prefecture
1999 births
Living people
Japanese expatriates in Taiwan